Charney Bassett is a village and civil parish about  north of Wantage and  east of Faringdon in the Vale of White Horse. It was part of Berkshire until the 1974 boundary changes transferred it to Oxfordshire. The 2011 Census recorded the parish population as 314.  The River Ock flows through it, and divides here for a mile or so. The alternative name of the river, Charn or Cearn, may have originally applied to the northern arm only.

Archaeology
In 1978 Thames Water dredged a prehistoric flint axe-head from the River Ock in the parish. It looks like the nearby hill forts on the Berkshire Downs but is unusual in being built on more or less level ground, away from any hill. Cherbury means "fort beside the River Cearn". It is larger than Uffington Castle hill fort.

History
Charney Bassett has been settled since the Anglo-Saxon era. The earliest known records of the locality's history records a grant of land to the Abbot of Abingdon Abbey in 811. The surrounding area was largely marshland and the meaning of Charney is "island in the River Cearn". This was an alternative name for the River Ock, that runs close by and which supplies the mill stream. In about 1630 the Quaker evangelist Joan Vokins was born to Thomas Bunce of Charney.

Notable buildings and structures
The Church of England parish church of Saint Peter is Grade I listed. It has some twelfth-century parts and a turret with two medieval chiming bells. Noteworthy is the tympanum of the church, with a Romanesque relief depicting the ascension of Alexander the Great to the sky, a legendary episode from a version of the so called Pseudo-Callisthenes (the Alexander Romance).  Along with the churches of Longworth, Hinton Waldrist, Lyford, Buckland, Pusey and Littleworth, it is part of the Benefice of Cherbury with Gainfield.  

On the village green is a medieval stone pillar mounted upon three steps. This may have been a market cross where goods could be offered for sale at certain times of the year.  A sundial was later added to the top and this would have been used as the village time-piece. After the First World War the centre step was replaced with a dressed stone memorial to the fallen, whose names are inscribed thereon.  Charney Manor is a Grade I listed building. It was built in the thirteenth century as a grange for Abingdon Abbey, which then owned extensive land around the village. It is now owned by the Quakers. Charney Water Mill and its adjoining cottage are Grade II listed. The mill is owned by Oxfordshire County Council and leased to the parish council. The machinery is mainly intact and the mill has been undergoing restoration by the Vale of White Horse Industrial Archaeology Group since about 1975.  The parish has 18 other Grade II listed buildings.

Amenities
Charney Bassett has a public house, the Chequers Inn.

References

Further reading

External links

Villages in Oxfordshire
Civil parishes in Oxfordshire